Gia Doonan (born June 30, 1994) is an American rower.

She attended Tabor Academy and the University of Texas.

She won Gold at the 2018 World Rowing Championships.
She won a medal at the 2019 World Rowing Championships.

She rowed in the United States women's eight at the 2020 Summer Olympics.

She is openly lesbian.

References

External links

1994 births
Living people
American female rowers
World Rowing Championships medalists for the United States
Tabor Academy (Massachusetts) alumni
Sportspeople from Massachusetts
Rowers at the 2020 Summer Olympics
American LGBT sportspeople
Texas Longhorns athletes
21st-century American women